Kapp Linné Bird Sanctuary is a bird reserve at Svalbard, Norway, established in 1973. It includes areas between Randvika and Fyrsjøen on Nordenskiöld Land. The protected area covers a total area of around 1,900,000 square metres.

References

Bird sanctuaries in Svalbard
Protected areas established in 1973
1973 establishments in Norway
Spitsbergen